Vincent Massey Collegiate is a high school located in Montreal, Quebec, Canada. It is a part of the English Montreal School Board (EMSB).

History 
The building that is now Vincent Massey Collegiate was originally a high school built in 1959 by the Montreal Catholic School Commission (CECM) called École Secondaire Philippe-Perrier. In 1976 it became an English high school and the name was changed to Vincent Massey High School. Depending on the years it was used as a junior high school such as in 1978 and 1979 or a senior high school. In 1985, following the closing of Holy Names High School, it became a regular high school with grades 7 to 11.

It was a part of the Catholic school commission until 1998. In July 1998 school boards were reorganized and the school came under the jurisdiction on the English Montreal School Board.

References

External links
Vincent Massey Collegiate (Montreal)

High schools in Montreal
English-language schools in Quebec
English Montreal School Board
Rosemont–La Petite-Patrie